Muhammad Ghunaymi Hilal (1917-1968) was an Egyptian scholar and literary critic. He is credited as the founder of Arabic comparative literature.
Hilal is best known for his influential book Adab Al-Muqāran.

References

1917 births
1968 deaths
Egyptian literary critics
Paris-Sorbonne University alumni
Egyptian expatriates in France